The International Conference on Distributed Event-Based Systems is a conference in computer science.

History 
The DEBS event began as a series of five workshops run annually from 2002 to 2006. These DEBS workshops were co-located variously with International Conference on Distributed Computing Systems (IEEE ICDCS), ACM SIGMOD Conference/PODS and International Conference on Software Engineering (ACM ICSE).

The inaugural DEBS conference was held in 2007, in Toronto, Canada, and has been held annually since.

Conference structure 

DEBS events follow the structure of many computer science conferences, runs a sequential track program, and includes tracks for:
 Research papers
 Industry submissions
 Tutorials
 Demonstrations and posters
and a doctoral workshop.

A recent, novel feature of the conference is the "Grand Challenges" track, which aims to provide a datasets and exercises by which academic and industrial teams may compete to demonstrate the strengths of their solutions.

Location history
 2017: Barcelona, Spain
 2016: Irvine, California, United States
 2015: Oslo, Norway
 2014: Mumbai, India
 2013: Arlington, Texas, United States
 2012: Berlin, Germany
 2011: New York City, New York, United States
 2010: Cambridge, United Kingdom
 2009: Nashville, Tennessee, United States
 2008: Rome, Italy
 2007: Toronto, Ontario, Canada

DEBS Workshops
 2006: Lisbon, Portugal
 2005: Columbus, Ohio, United States
 2004: Edinburgh, Scotland
 2003: San Diego, California, USA
 2002: Vienna, Austria

See also 
 List of computer science conferences

References

External links 
 http://debs.org/
 DEBS 2017- June 19–23, 2017, Barcelona, Spain
 DEBS 2016- June 20–24, 2016, Irvine, CA, USA
 DEBS 2015- June 29-July 3, 2015, Oslo, Norway
 DEBS 2014 - May 26–29, 2014, Mumbai, India
 DEBS 2013 - June 29-July 3, 2013, Arlington, Texas, USA
 DEBS 2012 - July 16–20, 2012, Freie Universitaet Berlin, Berlin, Germany
 DEBS 2011 - July 11–14, 2011, New York, U.S.
 DEBS 2010 - July 12–15, 2010, Cambridge, United Kingdom
 DEBS 2009 - July 6–9, 2009, Vanderbilt University Campus, Nashville, TN, USA
 DEBS 2008 - July 2–4, 2008, Rome, Italy
 DEBS 2007 - June 20–22, Toronto, Canada

Computer science conferences